Shiyan East railway station is a railway station in Zhangwan District, Shiyan, Hubei, China.

History
The station opened with the Wuhan–Shiyan high-speed railway on 29 December 2019.

Position 
The station is currently the terminus of the Wuhan–Shiyan high-speed railway. On opening of the Shiyan–Xi'an high-speed railway, the station will become an intermediate stop on a high-speed route from Wuhan to Xi'an.

References

Railway stations in Hubei
Railway stations in China opened in 2019